Șumuleu River may refer to:

 Șumuleu, a tributary of the Putna in Harghita County
 Șumuleu, a tributary of the Pustnic in Harghita County